The House of Sverre was a royal house or dynasty which ruled, at various times in history, the Kingdom of Norway, hereunder the kingdom's realms, and the Kingdom of Scotland. The house was founded with King Sverre Sigurdsson. It provided the rulers of Norway from 1184 to 1319.

History
 
The house was founded with King Sverre Sigurdsson, who claimed to be an illegitimate son of King Sigurd Munn, when he was made King of Norway. After Sverre's death, his descendants would expand the influence, wealth, and power of the dynasty. Under his grandson Haakon IV's rule, the Kingdom of Norway reached its peak, the 
civil war era ended, and it was the start of a golden age in Norway.

Margaret, Maid of Norway, a queen-designate of the Kingdom of Scotland, was also a member of this family.

His descendants consist of the House of Rosensverd (Norway) 

The house replaced the Gille dynasty, and was again replaced by the House of Bjelbo, which inherited Norway's throne. They were the last reigning family that claimed patrilineal descent from Harald Fairhair.

Coat of arms

The main arms of the kings belonging to the House of Sverre, was a golden crowned lion on a red field. The lion was later supplied with a silver axe symbolising Olaf the Holy. This became the coat of arms of Norway.

List of kings 
The rulers within the royal house or dynasty would often have a "junior king" along with a "senior king" (three dates show the reign as junior king to the start of reign as senior to the end of their reign). Here is a list of the rulers when the house held the power in Norway:

Other members
 Margaret, Maid of Norway
 Ingeborg of Norway (Daughter)
 Princes Agnes of Norway (Daughter)
 House of Rosensverd (Norway)

See also
 List of Norwegian monarchs
 Norwegian Royal Family
 Norwegian nobility

References

 
 Sverre
Norwegian monarchy
Sverre